Edgar Bowers (March 2, 1924 – February 4, 2000) was an American poet who won the Bollingen Prize in Poetry in 1989.

Biography
Bowers was born in Rome, Georgia, in 1924. During World War II, he joined the military and worked in counter-intelligence against Germany. He graduated from the University of North Carolina at Chapel Hill in 1950 and did graduate work in English literature at Stanford University. Bowers published several books of poetry, including The Form of Loss, For Louis Pasteur and The Astronomers. He won two fellowships from the Guggenheim Foundation and taught at Duke University and the University of California, Santa Barbara.

In Bowers's obituary, the English poet Clive Wilmer wrote, "The title poem of his 1990 collection, For Louis Pasteur, announces his key loyalties. He confessed to celebrating every year the birthdays of three heroes: Pasteur, Mozart and Paul Valéry, all of whom suggest admiration for the life of the mind lived at its highest pitch — a concern for science and its social uses, and a love of art that is elegant, cerebral and orderly." Another aspect of Bowers is highlighted by Thom Gunn on the back of Bowers's Collected Poems: "Bowers started with youthful stoicism, but the feeling is now governed by an increasing acceptance of the physical world." That 'physical world' encompasses sex and love which are refracted through his restrained and lapidary lines. The effect of this contrast is striking: at once balanced and engaged; detached but acutely aware of sensual satisfactions. Bowers' style owes much to the artistic ethos of Yvor Winters, under whom Bowers studied at Stanford, but his achievement far surpasses that of his mentor, and his other students, such as J. V. Cunningham. He often wrote in rhyme, but also produced some of the finest blank verse in the English language. He wrote very little (his Collected Poems weighs in at 168 pages), due no doubt to the careful consideration behind every single line. But that care never forecloses on the wilder aspects of human existence — the needs, joys and violence.

Bowers retired in 1991 and died in San Francisco in 2000.

References

Publications
 The Form of Loss (Alan Swallow, 1956)
 The Astronomers (Alan Swallow, 1965)
 Living Together (David R. Godine, 1973)
 For Louis Pasteur (Princeton University Press, 1989)
 Collected Poems (Alfred A. Knopf, 1997)

External links 
 Bowers's page at poets.org
 Clive Wilmer's Guardian obituary
 Edgar Bowers Collection at Stuart A. Rose Manuscript, Archives, and Rare Book Library 

1924 births
2000 deaths
People from Rome, Georgia
University of North Carolina at Chapel Hill alumni
Poets from Georgia (U.S. state)
Stanford University alumni
Duke University faculty
University of California, Santa Barbara faculty
Bollingen Prize recipients
20th-century American poets
American military personnel of World War II